ISSCO's Tellagraf is an early software package designed to allow end-users to "turn out full color, professional quality charts" with initial results displayed on a screen, modified as needed, and then "a final 'hard-copy' can be made .. or made into 35mm color transparencies for projection onto a screen."

Users of Tellagraf often had access to CueChart and Disspla software.

Terminals with varying degrees of graphics, such as the DEC's VT100 and Tektronix's Tektronix 4xxx family of text and graphics terminals. were supported, and the software ran on popular computing platforms.

History
Four years are important to Tellagraf's early history:
 1978: ease of use
 1980: graphic-artist quality 
 1982: introduction of CueChart, and recognition by IEEE.
 1983: "quality graphics enters the mainstream of data processing with ..."

Tellegraf was eventually acquired by Computer Associates and renamed CA-Tellegraf. SAS users found it helpful.

Universities, research institutes and financial services firms were among early users.

Tellagraf, CueChart and Disspla were separate software packages, but often computer sites having one had all three.

Disspla
Disspla is a package of data plotting subroutines that can be used from high level languages. It was also acquired by Computer Associates.

ISSCO Graphics
ISSCO Graphics (Integrated Software Systems Corporation), vendor of Tellagraf, CueChart and Disspla, had considered acquiring Breakthrough Software, whose software focus involved PC DOS, as a means of getting into the PC arena, but backed off when Computer Associates made an offer to acquire ISSCO.

By early 1987 it was reported that "Issco users breathe sigh of relief" that all was well.

The ISSCO User's Group was founded in 1976.

ISSCO, which was founded in 1970 by Peter Preuss, was acquired by Computer Associates in 1986.

Tellaplan
In 1983 ISSCO introduced "Tellaplan, a project planning, report and schedule charting system for Tell-A- Graf users in IBM MVS or CMS or Digital Equipment Corp. VAX computers" atop which they built "two visual project management software packages" three years later.

References

Proprietary software
Graph products
Computer graphics